Dincklage is the name of a German family of Westphalian ancient nobility from Dinklage near Vechta, Lower Saxony.
There are currently still two lines of the family: the Campe line and the Schulenburg line. 
The family is first attested 1231 with Johannes de Thinclage. The males of the family carry the title Baron or Freiherr.

Further reading 
 G. Sudendorf: Geschichte der Herren von Dincklage. Osnabrück / Hannover, 1842, part 1–1844, part 2.
 Gothaisches Genealogisches Taschenbuch. Freiherren. 1861–1942.
 Genealogisches Handbuch des Adels. 37/1966
 Genealogisches Handbuch des Adels, Adelslexikon vol. II, vol. 58 of the series, C. A. Starke Verlag, Limburg (Lahn) 1974,

References

German noble families